Bo Kaspers Orkester is a Swedish pop-rock band with strong influences of jazz, formed in 1991. Consist of Bo Sundström, Fredrik Dahl, Michael Malmgren and Mats Schubert and won a Grammis award in 1998 for artist of the year.

Discography

Albums
Söndag i sängen (1993)
På hotell (1995)
Amerika (1996)
I centrum (1998)
Kaos (2001)
Vilka tror vi att vi är (2003)
Hund (2006)
8 (2008) 
New Orleans (2010)
Du borde tycka om mig (2012)
Redo Att Gå Sönder (2015)
23:55 (2019)
I denna mörka vintertid (2021)

Compilations
Hittills (1999)
You and Me (2000)
Samling (2009)
Så mycket Bo Kaspers Orkester (2013)

Live albums
 Sto-Gbg live-DVD (2004)
Bo Kaspers Orkester live, Vega Köpenhamn live-DVD (2007)

References

External links
Official website

Swedish musical groups
Swedish-language singers